This is a complete list of members of the United States House of Representatives during the 114th United States Congress (January 3, 2015 – January 3, 2017) ordered by seniority.

Non-consecutive terms 
The "*" indicates that the representative/delegate may have served one or more non-consecutive terms while in the House of Representatives of the United States Congress.

Complete seniority list

Delegates

See also
 114th United States Congress
 List of U.S. congressional districts
 List of United States senators in the 114th Congress by seniority

References

External links
 Clerk of the House of Representatives
 Terms of Service for House Members at the Opening of 114th Congress - January 3, 2015
 Terms of Service for House Members at the Close of the 114th Congress - January 3, 2017

Seniority
114